Yiğit Gülmezoğlu (born ) is a Turkish male volleyball player. He is part of the Turkey men's national volleyball team. On club level he plays for Arkas İzmir.

References

External links
 profile at FIVB.org

1995 births
Living people
Turkish men's volleyball players
Sportspeople from İzmir
Volleyball players at the 2015 European Games
European Games competitors for Turkey
21st-century Turkish people